Ulrik Saltnes (born 10 November 1992) is a Norwegian professional footballer who plays as a midfielder for Bodø/Glimt.

Club career
Saltnes was born in Brønnøysund. He made his senior debut for Bodø/Glimt on 15 April 2012 against Alta; Bodø/Glimt won 1–0.

Career statistics

Honours
Bodø/Glimt
Eliteserien: 2020, 2021

References

1992 births
Living people
People from Brønnøy
Association football defenders
Norwegian footballers
Eliteserien players
Norwegian First Division players
FK Bodø/Glimt players
Sportspeople from Nordland